The oblique popliteal ligament (posterior ligament) is a broad, flat, fibrous band on the posterior knee representing an expansion of the tendon of the semimembranosus muscle. It attaches onto the intercondylar fossa and lateral condyle of the femur.

Anatomy 
The oblique popliteal ligament is formed as a lateral expansion of the tendon of the semimembranosus muscle and represents one of the muscle's five insertions. The ligament blends with the posterior portion of the knee joint capsule. The ligament passes superiorly and laterally to attach to the intercondylar fossa and lateral condyle of the femur.

Structure 
The ligament is formed of fasciculi separated from one another by apertures for the passage of vessels and nerves.

Relations 
The oblique popliteal ligament forms part of the floor of the popliteal fossa; the popliteal artery lies upon the ligament. The ligament is pierced by posterior division of the obturator nerve, as well as the middle genicular nerve, the middle genicular artery, and the middle genicular vein.

Clinical significance 
The oblique popliteal ligament may be damaged, causing a valgus deformity. Surgical repair of the ligament often leads to better outcomes than conservative management.

The oblique popliteal ligament may be cut during arthroscopic meniscus repair surgery.

Additional images

References

External links
 
 
  - "Major Joints of the Lower Extremity: Knee Joint"

Ligaments of the lower limb